Kyle Bobby Dunn (born February 27, 1986) is a Canadian composer, arranger, and live performer of modern compositional and guitar based drone music. He has performed in live and exclusive outdoor settings, including Banff National Park, since 2000 and has released music on various international recording labels.

His work has been described as "compositions that are patience incarnate" and "encourage an emotional response even as its seemingly infinite, creeping swirl and hum threatens to numb. A difficult feat."
It is music that often "captures a mood somewhere between sadness and strength; it's the sound of a respite that occurs after having survived an ordeal; it's sound as memory, as memorial."

The austere, tempered tonal shifts featured in many of his compositions subtly echo the work of minimalist forerunners like Morton Feldman and La Monte Young. At the same time Dunn occasionally intersperses quaint, almost chamberal touches which evoke more traditionally classical sources.

Drawing from cinematic and classical music as much as drone and ambient, Dunn operates outside of categories, instead viewing the music he makes as a personal and reflective document of his experience, as "soundtrack suites" to his own life: past, present and future.

Background & Musical History

First realized in Calgary, Alberta, Dunn started composing and arranging his music for homemade films mostly on piano and cassette tapes (audio and video) in the late 1990s. His first love was filmmaking and it was film music that initially attracted him to composing his own works. He began performing and recording under the names 'Subtract by Two' and Kyle Bobby Dunn  with the first self-released album, Music for Medication around 2002–2003.

In interviews he has often mentioned large admiration for classical and soundtrack composers including Arvo Pärt, Valentin Silvestrov, John Williams, Ennio Morricone and Jerry Fielding, yet his own music often exhibits a more quiet, minimalist, and droning nature that is often compared to ambient contemporary musicians William Basinski, Brian Eno and Stars of the Lid.

Releasing what he has referred to as his 'first proper full length' album, Fragments & Compositions of Kyle Bobby Dunn, on Boston's Sedimental label in 2008.
The album covered several years of his earliest compositional works, mainly for strings and piano.

In early 2010, a long form album that filled a double compact disc set containing five years worth of his music, A Young Person's Guide to Kyle Bobby Dunn, released on the UK based label Low Point, received positive reviewed by Steve Smith at The New York Times as "something like a chamber-music equivalent of Kirlian photography: dark, shadowy and indistinct at its core, surrounded by an iridescent glow. The effect is mysterious, hypnotic and deeply affecting."

He released Ways of Meaning in 2011 on Buffalo, New York imprint, Desire Path Recordings, to unanimously positive reception. The Huffington Post's Daniel Kushner wrote, "Dunn presents the listener with sounds that seemingly, have no beginning, nor any end. There are not so much melodies, in the conventional sense – but rather an economical assemblage of tones, which linger in the air like the quivering brush strokes in an Impressionist still life."

In 2012 he released another double disc set of long form works on the Low Point label. Bring Me the Head of Kyle Bobby Dunn was recorded at the artist's Bunce Cake studio and throughout remote locations in his native Canada. The recordings revealed a most personal and deeply emotional aspect of the composer's work and reached a high standard for electronically produced and arranged music – only utilizing an electric guitar and loop station pedal for the album's 15 songs. The disc received a largely positive response and was heralded by Resident Advisor as being among his finest work.

In addition to the massive double disc release of 2012, a five song vinyl record was released later in the year on the Toronto label, Komino. It was considered as "a tightening of the composer's sound – the signature elements are there; cyclical patterns, drifts of spidery drones, buried static, but though they somehow seem slower and more stately than before, they seem focused, resolute" and "in a quiet master class in poised composition; constantly in motion, and in perfect stillness" by John Boursnell at UK's Fluid Radio.

In mid 2014 he released his largest full-length release album to date, 'Kyle Bobby Dunn & The Infinite Sadness.' The album is one of the artist's largest and most emotionally complex release with many of the previous guitar laden sounds of previous releases stretched out to long crescendos and intricate melodic development. The release is available on the triple vinyl and double compact disc formats.

After a few years of almost complete silence, 2019 saw the artist release the even longer, nearly 3 hour album 'From Here to Eternity,' with positive accolades and reviews from many notable music journalists — and made available in the most ambitious format so far, a quadruple vinyl release that was paired with nearly 3 more hours of sketches and B-side material that failed to make the original album cut.  
Pitchfork Media gave the release an 8.0 rating, which is rare for drone music covered on the site, and wrote "there is a coppery burnish that was not there before, a tendency to float just beyond the bounds of our usual limits of musical perception. There is a sense of presence here that’s hard to put your finger on—an undercurrent, a shadow, something felt but not heard."

In 2020 and during much of the COVID-19 pandemic he began releasing archival works from past sessions and unreleased material or versions as Selected Ambient Expansion Pack, and has in the last year released what appears to be a 4 part series of an album documenting his latest work during the pandemic restrictions and winter long curfew that was set in the province of Quebec. The Cohesive Redundancies, is only available digitally through the artist's official Bandcamp release site.

Discography

Full Length Releases
 Music for Medication (Ltd. CDR 2002, Housing)
 Music for Medication (CD Reissue 2005, This Generation Tapes)
 Applications for Guitar (Ltd. CDR 2006, Housing)
 Fragments & Compositions of (CD 2008, Sedimental/LP 2014, Low Point)
 A Young Person's Guide to Kyle Bobby Dunn (2xCD 2010, Low Point)
 Ways of Meaning (LP, Digital 2011, Desire Path Recordings)
 Bring Me The Head of Kyle Bobby Dunn (2xCD 2012, Low Point/3xLP 2021, Diggers Factory) 
 And The Infinite Sadness (3xLP, 2xCD, Digital 2014, Students of Decay/3x Cassette, Crystal Creek)
 From Here to Eternity (4xLP, 3xCD, Digital 2019, Past Inside the Present)
 FHTE-B (3x Cassette, Digital 2019, Past Inside the Present)  
 Selected Ambient Expansion Pack (Digital 2020, Self-released)
 BMTHO/Bring Me The Head Of Kyle Bobby Dunn (3xLP, Digital 2021, Diggers Factory)  
 TCR-P1 (Digital 2021, Self-released) 
 TCR: Deuxième (Digital 2021, Self-released) 
 TCR: III (Digital 2021, Self-released) 
 †CR4 (Digital 2021, Self-released) 
 WGR (Digital, 2022, Self-released)

EPs & Limited Editions 
 Expanse at Low Levels (Digital Compilation 2007, Moodgadget)
 You Made Me Realise (Ltd. Cassette 2005, Housing)
 Six Cognitive Works (Ltd. CDR/FLAC 2007, Kning Disk)
 Fervency (File/FLAC 2009, Moodgadget)
 Rural Route No. 2 (Ltd. CDR 2010, Standard Form)
 Pour les Octaves (Ltd. Cassette 2010, Peasant Magik)
 SMM: Context (CD, LP, Digital Compilation 2011, Ghostly International)
 Intimate Rituals of Kyle Bobby Dunn (Ltd. CDR 2011, Intransitive Recordings)
 In Miserum Stercus (Ltd. Vinyl LP 2012, Komino)
 A Chance Happening (C30 Ltd, 2015, Shaking Box)
 Cescon (Digital 2015, Self-released) 
 The Searchers (Vinyl 2018, Whited Sepulchre)
 Kyle Bobby Dunn/Anjou Print/Track 04 (10" Vinyl, 2018 Thesis)
 The Sender (Digital 2020, Self-released)
 And You Could Have It All (Digital 2020, Self-released)
 They Have Always Been Within (Digital 2020, Self-released)
 Interlude (Digital 2020, Self-released) 
 Given (Digital 2020, Self-released)

	 
Collaborations
	 
 PERILS – PERILS (Kyle Bobby Dunn and Benoît Pioulard), (vinyl/digital 2015, Desire Path Recordings)

See also 
List of ambient music artists

References

External links 
 Official site

1986 births
Living people
Experimental composers
Canadian classical composers
Canadian contemporary artists
American experimental musicians
Canadian electronic musicians
Ambient musicians
Musicians from Calgary
Musicians from Mississauga
Canadian conceptual artists
21st-century classical composers
Contemporary classical music performers
Minimalist composers
Postminimalist composers
Postmodern composers
Canadian digital artists
Canadian male classical composers
20th-century American composers
21st-century American composers
20th-century Canadian composers
21st-century Canadian composers
20th-century American male musicians
21st-century American male musicians